The bluish-slate antshrike (Thamnomanes schistogynus) is a species of bird in the family Thamnophilidae. It is found in Bolivia, Brazil, and Peru. Its natural habitat is subtropical or tropical moist lowland forests.

References

bluish-slate antshrike
Birds of the Bolivian Amazon
Birds of the Peruvian Amazon
bluish-slate antshrike
Taxonomy articles created by Polbot